Indoor Stadium Huamark is an indoor sporting arena, located in Bangkok, Thailand. The original capacity of the arena is 15,000 spectators and it was built in 1966 for the 5th Asian Games. After renovation for 2012 FIFA Futsal World Cup, the capacity is reduced to 6,000 seats and expandable to 8,000 seats.

It is used mainly for concerts, badminton, boxing, basketball, futsal, and volleyball. On 22 May 2001, Irish vocal pop band Westlife held a concert for their Where Dreams Come True Tour supporting their album Coast to Coast.

History
Indoor Stadium Huamark originally named Kittikachorn Stadium, based on the last name of former prime minister Thanom Kittikachorn. The stadium was built for the 1966 Asian Games which was hosted by Thailand. The name was later changed to Indoor Stadium Huamark until today.

Transportation
Indoor Stadium Huamark is accessible from  Ramkhamhaeng Station of the Airport Rail Link and In 2024 it can accessible from Rajamangala Stadium of the MRT Orange Line.

References

External links

Arena information 

Indoor arenas in Thailand
Sports venues completed in 1966
Sports venues in Bangkok
Indoor Stadium Huamark
Basketball venues in Thailand
Volleyball venues in Thailand
Boxing venues in Thailand
Taekwondo venues
Badminton venues
Badminton in Thailand